Fonvizinskaya is a Moscow Metro station of Lyublinsko-Dmitrovskaya Line. It is located between Butyrskaya and Petrovsko-Razumovskaya, at the intersection of Milashenkova Street with Fonvizina Street and Ogorodny Proyezd. It has one island platform. Ulitsa Milashenkova station of the Moscow Monorail is located close by. The name of the station derives from Fonvizina Street, which in turn was named after Denis Fonvizin, an 18th-century Russian playwright.

The extension of the line from Maryina Roshcha northwest to Petrovsko-Razumovskaya via Butyrskaya and Fonvizinskaya was originally planned to be opened in December 2015. The projected opening date was later shifted to 2016. The station was opened on 16 September 2016.

References

Moscow Metro stations
Railway stations in Russia opened in 2016
Lyublinsko-Dmitrovskaya Line
Railway stations located underground in Russia